Ernst Wilhelm Eduard von Knorr (8 March 1840 – 17 February 1920) was a German admiral of the Kaiserliche Marine who helped establish the German colonial empire.

Life

Born in Saarlouis, Rhenish Prussia, Knorr entered the Prussian Navy in 1856. While serving on the corvette Danzig, he fought against pirates off the coast of Morocco later that year. In 1859 he was promoted to Unterleutnant. From 1859 to 1862, he sailed with the Elbe on an expedition to the Far East. He was promoted to Leutnant in 1862 and Kapitänleutnant in 1865.

On 12 November 1870, during the Franco-Prussian War, Knorr commanded the gunboat  in a battle with the French aviso Bouvet near Havana, for which he was awarded the Iron Cross 2nd Class. In 1871 he was promoted to Korvettenkapitän.

Beginning in 1874, Knorr took part in a voyage through the Pacific Ocean to discuss trade negotiations with Tonga on behalf of the German Empire. He was named Kapitän zur See in 1876, Chief of Staff of the Admiralty in 1881, and Konteradmiral in 1883.

As commander of the West African Squadron in December 1884, Knorr intervened in disputes between rival clans in Douala, Cameroon, imposing German sovereignty over the Cameroon estuary. He was awarded the Order of the Red Eagle for this success. From 1 April to 4 July 1885, Knorr was Reichskommissar of the German colony of Kamerun. He then commanded a cruiser squadron travelling to Zanzibar and negotiated with its sultan for the acquisition of a strip of German colonial territory.

In 1886 Knorr commanded a cruiser squadron at Samoa. He was promoted to Vizeadmiral in 1889, Admiral in 1893, and Commanding Admiral in 1895. Raised to the German nobility on 18 January 1896, he received the Order of the Black Eagle on 15 June 1898. He retired in 1899 and was appointed an admiral à la suite of the Seeoffizierkorps.

Knorr died in Berlin. Admiral-Knorr-Straße, a street in Saarlouis, is named after him.

Honours
German honours
 Knight of the Order of the Red Eagle, 2nd Class with Oak Leaves and Swords, 1885; with Crown, 1894; Grand Cross with Swords on Ring, 27 January 1897 (Prussia)
 Knight of the Order of the Prussian Crown, 1st Class, 18 January 1893 (Prussia)
 Knight of the Order of the Black Eagle, 15 June 1898; with Collar, 17 January 1899 (Prussia)
 Iron Cross (1870), 2nd Class (Prussia)
 Service Award Cross (Prussia)
 Commander of the Order of the Zähringer Lion, 2nd Class with Swords, 1878; Grand Cross, 1895 (Baden)
 Grand Cross of the Military Merit Order (Bavaria)
 Grand Cross of the Order of the Griffon (Mecklenburg)
 Grand Cross of the Albert Order, with Golden Star, 1895 (Saxony)

Foreign honours
 Grand Cross of the Imperial Order of Leopold, 1895 (Austria-Hungary)
 Knight of the Order of the Iron Crown, 1st Class, 1890 (Austria-Hungary)
 Grand Cordon of the Order of Leopold (Belgium)
 Grand Cross of the Order of the Dannebrog, 30 July 1888 (Denmark)
 Grand Cross of the Order of Saints Maurice and Lazarus (Italy)
 Knight of the Order of St. Alexander Nevsky (Russia)
 Commander Grand Cross of the Order of the Sword, 27 July 1888 (Sweden-Norway)
 Knight of the Order of the Brilliant Star of Zanzibar, Class II Grade I (Sultanate of Zanzibar)

Literature

Further reading
 G.Beckmann, K.U. Keubke (Hrsg.): Alltag in der Kaiserlichen Marine um 1890. , S.102–103 
 Cord Eberspächer/Gerhard Wiechmann: Admiral Eduard von Knorr (1840–1920). Eine Karriere in der neuen Elite der Seeoffiziere in Preußen-Deutschland. In: Karl Christian Führer/Karen Hagemann/Birthe Kundrus (Hg.): Eliten im Wandel. Gesellschaftliche Führungsschichten im 19. und 20. Jahrhundert. Für Klaus Saul zum 65. Geburtstag, Münster 2004, S. 239–258

References

External links
Deutsche-Schutzgebiete.de biography  
Cameroon 1884

1840 births
1920 deaths
People from Saarlouis
People from the Rhine Province
German untitled nobility
Admirals of the Imperial German Navy
Prussian naval officers
German colonial people in Kamerun
German military personnel of the Franco-Prussian War
People of former German colonies
Recipients of the Iron Cross (1870), 2nd class
Grand Crosses of the Military Merit Order (Bavaria)
Grand Crosses of the Order of the Dannebrog
Knights Grand Cross of the Order of Saints Maurice and Lazarus
Commanders Grand Cross of the Order of the Sword
Military personnel from Saarland